The Changzhou Metro is a rapid transit system in Changzhou, Jiangsu province, China. The system started operation on 21 September 2019, with the opening of its first line, Line 1 becoming the 35th city in China with a subway in Mainland China.

Construction of Line 1 began on 28 October 2014. The line opened on 21 September 2019.

Announcements are made in Mandarin and English.

Lines in operation

Line 1

Line 1 started operation on 21 September 2019. Construction for Line 1 began on 28 October 2014. The line will be extended North for 3.5 km and South for 3.2 km.

In its first year of operation, the highest passenger flow in a single day was 243,000 on October 2 and total ridership in 2019 was 10.3 million.

Line 2

Construction for Line 2 began on 13 February 2017. It was opened on 28 June 2021.

Planned

Short term

Long term
According to the "Changzhou Urban Rail Transit Construction Plan (2011～2018)", the urban rail transit network of Changzhou City planned by 2050 consists of 7 lines with a total length of about 330 kilometers and 209 stations, including 15 interchange stations. The line network density in the core area is 1.12 km/km2, and the line network density in the central urban area is 0.19 km/km2.

Fares
Changzhou Metro has a starting price of 2 yuan, a starting mileage of 5 kilometers, and an upgrade mileage of "5, 5, 7, 7, 9" kilometers, and an increase of 1 yuan for each level. Namely: the fare of less than 5 kilometers (inclusive) is 2 yuan, the fare of 5-10 (inclusive) kilometers is 3 yuan, the fare of 10-15 (inclusive) kilometers is 4 yuan, and the fare is 15-22 (inclusive) kilometers. 5 yuan, 6 yuan fare for 22-29 (inclusive) kilometers, an increase of 1 yuan for every 9 kilometers above 29 kilometers.

Trains
Trains for the first phase were manufactured by CRRC Nanjing Puzhen. The trains used by Changzhou Rail Transit Line 1 are Type B cars. Each train is 6 cars and is composed of 4 motor cars and 2 trailer cars. The first phase of the project ordered 36 trainsets. The maximum passenger capacity of each train is 2062 people. At the same time, the train adopts lightweight aluminum alloy material with a service life of 30 years.

Network Map

References

Rapid transit in China
Rail transport in Jiangsu
Transport infrastructure under construction in China
Transport in Changzhou
Changzhou Metro